Paszkowski (feminine Paszkowska) is a Polish surname. Notable people with the surname include:

 Cezary Paszkowski (born 1948), Polish artist
 Walter Paszkowski (born 1934), Canadian politician

See also
 Paczkowski

Polish-language surnames